Events from the year 1334 in the Kingdom of Scotland.

Incumbents
Monarch – David II

Events
 23 December – Henry de Beaumont, 4th Earl of Buchan compelled to surrender to Andrew de Moray, the new Guardian of Scotland after a siege at Dundarg Castle.

See also

 Timeline of Scottish history

References

 
Years of the 14th century in Scotland
Wars of Scottish Independence